Bataillon is a surname of French origin. Notable people with the surname include:

 Jean Eugène Bataillon (1864–1953), French biologist
 Joseph Bataillon (born 1949), American judge
 Marcel Bataillon (1895–1977), French Hispanicist
 Quentin Bataillon (born 1993), French politician

Surnames of French origin